Iddaru Attala Muddula Alludu is a 2006 Telugu-language comedy film, produced by Smt. Gabbita Sudarmana on Siva Shakti Films banner and directed by Dev Anand. Starring Rajendra Prasad, Keerthi Chawla, Kovai Harathi, Suman  and music composed by Prasad. The film was loosely inspired from Tamil film Summa Irunga Machan.

Plot
The film begins with Balu a young charm, arriving in Hyderabad and meeting a business magnate Chandra Shekar who mistakes him as his nephew. Chandra Shekar suffers between his two wives Seeta & Sarala as they are loath each other and resides in neighboring bungalows. Right Now, Chandra Shekar advises him to enroll as a servant in his house. As a street-smart Balu quickly ingratiates with them and also wins over their daughters Vandana & Chandana and both of them affirm to marry him. Here, Seeta & Sarala take it as a personal challenge and Chandra Shekar is unable to decide what to do? Thereupon, Balu makes a play by creating as if Chandra Shekar has committed suicide when his wives are shattered. After being sealed their properties by debtors, Balu shifts them to a small house. Thereafter, the women bond, and the daughters get pally enough that each wants to sacrifice Balu. The rest of the story is about how Balu gets rid of these problems and with whom he is going to couple up?

Cast
Rajendra Prasad as Balu
Keerthi Chawla as Vandana
Kovai Harathi as Chandana
Suman as Chandra Shekar
Seetha as Seeta
Kovai Sarala as Sarala
Narra Venkateswara Rao
Venu Madhav
Gundu Hanumantha Rao
Kallu Chidambaram
Gowtham Raju
Kadamdari Kiran
Alapati Lakshmi
Jeeva
Jenny

Soundtrack

Music composed by Prasad. Music released on MADHURA Audio Company.

Others
 VCDs and DVDs on - VOLGA Videos, Hyderabad

References

2000s Telugu-language films
2006 romantic comedy films
2006 films
Indian romantic comedy films
Polygamy in fiction